A gubernatorial election was held on 12 April 1987 to elect the Governor of Hokkaido Prefecture.

Candidates
Takahiro Yokomichi - incumbent governor of Hokkaido, age 46.
 - Secretary of the Food Agency, age 57.
 - president of the Hokkaido Medical Institution, age 60.

Results

References

Hokkaido gubernational elections
1987 elections in Japan